Pygora bella is a species of Scarabaeidae, the dung beetle family.

References 

Cetoniinae
Beetles described in 1879